If I Believe is the fourth studio album by Japanese recording artist Mai Kuraki. It was released on July 9, 2003, only nine months after Fairy Tale.

Commercial performance
If I Believe debuted at number-one with 251,218 copies sold making it Kuraki's fourth number-one debut. The album stayed on the Oricon albums chart for a total of 20 weeks of which the album consecutively spent 4 in the top 10. If I Believe was the 24th best selling album of 2003.

Track listing

Charts and certifications

References

External links 

2003 albums
Mai Kuraki albums
Being Inc. albums
Giza Studio albums
Japanese-language albums
Albums produced by Daiko Nagato